Wayne Woodson is a stage and film actor who appeared in a number of films in the 1980s which include the Paul Wendkos made for television drama, The Five of Me and Norbert Meisel's 1985 crime action film, Walking the Edge He was also in  the 1988 romantic comedy The Perfect Match.

Film work
In 1981, he had a role as the jail guard in a Paul Wendkos directed TV drama The Five of Me which starred David Birney, Dee Wallace, Mitch Ryan and James Whitmore. The following year, he had a part in the 1982 film I Ought to Be in Pictures which was written by Neil Simon and directed by Herbert Ross. This film starred Walter Matthau, Ann-Margret and Dinah Manoff.

He played the part of McKee, a criminal gang member in the Norbert Meisel directed 1983 revenge film Walking the Edge, which starred Robert Forster and Nancy Kwan. His slick character, was a member of a ruthless criminal gang which included Jesus (played by Luis Contreras) and Jimmy (played by James McIntire). The gang which had killed a woman's husband and son were led by Bruster played by Joe Spinnell.

In 1988, he appeared in A Perfect Match, a romantic comedy about a man and woman pretending to be people they are not. It starred Rob Paulsen, Jennifer Edwards and Mark McClure and was directed by Mark Deimel.

Filmography

References

External links

 
Hollywood.com biography

1949 births
Living people
African-American male actors
American male film actors
American male television actors
21st-century African-American people
20th-century African-American people